= Meadow Island, New York =

Island in Nassau Country, New York, United States of America

Coordinates: 40.604°N 73.560°W

Meadow Island is an island situated in Nassau County, New York, off the southern shore of Long Island.
